Eucithara vexillum is a small sea snail, a marine gastropod mollusk in the family Mangeliidae.

Description
The length of the shell attains 11 mm.

The whorls are nodulous at the shoulder, with ribs descending from the nodules. The entire surface of the shell is decussately striated, as if very finely granulated. The color of the shell is orange-yellow, with a number of
narrow whitish bands.

Distribution
This marine species occurs in the Central Pacific off Fiji. and Queensland (Australia).

References

  Reeve, L.A. 1846. Monograph of the genus Mangelia. pls 1-8 in Reeve, L.A. (ed). Conchologia Iconica. London : L. Reeve & Co. Vol. 3.

External links
  Tucker, J.K. 2004 Catalog of recent and fossil turrids (Mollusca: Gastropoda). Zootaxa 682:1-1295
  Hedley, C. 1922. A revision of the Australian Turridae. Records of the Australian Museum 13(6): 213-359, pls 42-56

vexillum
Gastropods described in 1846